Sarah Evanetz (born June 27, 1975) is a former competition swimmer from Canada, who competed for her native country at the 1996 Summer Olympics in Atlanta, Georgia. There she finished in 15th in the 100-metre butterfly, and in fifth place with the Canadian relay team in the 4×100-metre medley relay, alongside Julie Howard, Guylaine Cloutier and Shannon Shakespeare.

External links
Canadian Olympic Committee

1975 births
Living people
Canadian female butterfly swimmers
Canadian female freestyle swimmers
Medalists at the FINA World Swimming Championships (25 m)
Olympic swimmers of Canada
Swimmers from Vancouver
Swimmers at the 1996 Summer Olympics
UBC Thunderbirds swimmers
Swimmers at the 1999 Pan American Games
Pan American Games gold medalists for Canada
Pan American Games medalists in swimming
Medalists at the 1999 Pan American Games